Taeniochauliodes is a genus of fishflies in the family Corydalidae.

Description 
Taeniochauliodes is the most common genus of fishfly in South Africa. It is distinguishable from Platychauliodes and Madachauliodes by the fusion of two of the longitudinal anal veins in the forewing as well as large ocelli.

Taeniochauliodes forms a clade with Protochauliodes and Neohermes, together distributed across Australia, North America, and the nearctic.

Taxonomy 
Taeniochauliodes contains the following species:

 Taeniochauliodes barnardi
 Taeniochauliodes angustus
 Taeniochauliodes esbenpeterseni
 Taeniochauliodes natalensis
 Taeniochauliodes fuscus
 Taeniochauliodes minutus
 Taeniochauliodes ochraceopennis
 Taeniochauliodes attenuatus

References 

Corydalidae